MTV Middle East, formerly MTV Arabia, was a free-to-air music television channel, and the Middle Eastern incarnation of MTV. As an addition to the MTV network, it was a joint venture between MTV Networks International and Arabian Television Network, a subsidiary of Arabian Broadcasting Network, and part of Arab Media Group, the largest media group in the United Arab Emirates. Launched as MTV Arabia, the channel was rebranded as MTV Middle East on August 30, 2011.

The channel began its initial broadcast on October 27, 2007, and was launched on November 17, 2007.
As of 5 January 2015, MTV Middle East has stopped airing on Nilesat, and moved the whole localised channel to pay TV model on OSN under the name MTV Live HD.

Beginnings
The first mention of the project came within the coverage of MTV's 25th anniversary in 2006, and was revealed by Faisal Abbas, the media editor of the London-based pan-Arab daily, Asharq Al-Awsat, which reported that MTV is "very interested in the Arab satellite channel market" and quoted Dean Possenniskie, the network's vice president and general manager for emerging markets, saying, "Hopefully [we] will be in the market in the next 24 months" but "it all depends on finding the right local partners".

Akon, Ludacris, as well as Lebanese-Canadian Karl Wolf, Qusai aka Don Legend the Kamelion - the first Saudi Arabian hip hop artist, and the UAE's Desert Heat took part in the launching ceremonies of the channel in November 2007. Furthermore, Karl Wolf single "Africa" became the first ever video clip broadcast on the new music station.

MTV Europe was previously available in the region through a special deal with Showtime Arabia. The Showtime Arabia channel provided some Arabic music videos and a locally produced program called "Mashaweer" that later got renamed "Salaam" whose hosts included regional DJ Madjam & main host Susie iliyan.

Content
The channel aims to be a platform for the Arab youth, letting their opinions be a large factor in future programming. It will be likely that MTV Arabia will be pushing local R&B and hip hop music, which other Arab music stations like Rotana and Melody don't heavily feature says Patrick Samaha the General Manager of MTV Arabia.

MTV Middle East shows
Hip Hop Na
Block 13
Introducing
Baqabeeq
Banat
Rewes
Waslity
Amour
Cimena
MTV Weyakom
Na3na3
Arab Stars
created by the general manager Patrick Samaha and team (Sam Wahab, Wassim Hamdan, Jimmy Poon, Wessam Kattan, Rasha al emam, Fatma abou assi, Alaa Akawi, Mohamed Hamed, Roula Ghalyini, Fredwreck and Qusai)

Shows taken from MTV
MTV Middle East also airs series from MTV such as:

Awkward
Audrina
America's Best Dance Crew
I Used to Be Fat
Chelsea Settles
Nothing But Hits
Celebrity Deathmatch
Pimp My Ride
My Own
Life of Ryan
Why Can't I Be You
True Life
Two-A-Days
Cribs
Teen Cribs
Underemployed
Punk'd
The Ashlee Simpson Show
Making the Band
Taquita & Kaui
The Trip
The Shop
Falcon Dash
Wrestling Society X
Adventures in Hollyhood
Diary
Total Request Live
Rob & Big
Room 401
Room Raiders
Hogan Knows Best
Miss Seventeen
My Super Sweet 16
Headbangers Ball
The Hills
Boiling Points
The City 
Jackass 
Wonder Showzen 
The Real World
Nitro Circus
Paris Hilton's My New BFF
My Life As Liz
Made
Snooki & Jwoww
Catfish: The TV Show
Friendzone
Disaster Date
Ridiculousness
The Osbournes
Plain Jane
Fist of Zen
When I Was 17
Beavis and Butt-Head

References

External links

MTV Arabia's old URL address .
Interview with MTV's vice chairman Bill Roedy
MTV, Arab Media to launch Nickelodeon Arabia
Photo story about MTV Arabia in Vanity Fair Germany

MTV channels
Music television channels
Arabic-language television stations
Television channels and stations established in 2007
Music organisations based in the United Arab Emirates
Television channel articles with incorrect naming style
Television channels and stations disestablished in 2015